The 2016 Mini Challenge season was the fifteenth season of the Mini Challenge UK. The season started on 23 April at Donington Park and ended on 30 October at Snetterton Motor Racing Circuit. The season featured eight rounds across the UK.

Calendar

Entry list

Championship standings
Scoring system
Championship points were awarded for the first 32 positions in each Championship Race. Entries were required to complete 75% of the winning car's race distance in order to be classified and earn points. There were bonus points awarded for Pole Position and Fastest Lap.

Championship Race points

Drivers' Championship

JCW Class

Cooper S Class

Cooper Class

Open Class

References 

Mini Challenge UK
Mini Challenge UK